"Hopelessly Devoted to You" is a song recorded by British-Australian singer, songwriter and actress Olivia Newton-John for Grease: The Original Soundtrack from the Motion Picture (1978). It was written and produced by John Farrar and originally performed by Newton-John in the film version of the musical Grease (1978). The song was released in Australia in August 1978 and peaked at number two. It reached number three on the US Billboard Hot 100 and number seven on the Adult Contemporary chart. On the country chart, "Hopelessly Devoted to You" peaked at number 20 and was her first top 20 country hit in two years. Newton-John performed the song at the 21st Grammy Awards in 1979.

The song received an Oscar nomination as Best Original Song, losing to "Last Dance" from Thank God It's Friday at the 51st Academy Awards. Lyrically, the song is about Olivia's character in the movie, Australian newcomer Sandy Olsson, singing about how she keeps loving John Travolta's character Danny Zuko, leader of a gang of greaser boys, despite him brushing her off in favor of his friends.

Record World called it "a '50s-inspired love ballad with the production sound of the '70s."

In 2001, Swedish girl group Play covered the song on their debut album.

The song was not part of the original musical production (and was replaced with the 1950s standard "Since I Don't Have You" for the 1994 revival), but it was added to the score for the 2007 revival and was included in the 2016 Grease: Live performance, sung by Julianne Hough.

In June 2004, Farrar recalled writing the song: "'Hopelessly Devoted To You': I spent the longest period writing the lyrics of any song I've ever written. Every thesaurus and every rhyming dictionary I had, just trying to really make it work properly".

Background
Halfway through shooting Grease, Newton-John's contractually-entitled vocal solo had yet to be written. Farrar, Newton-John's personal producer, wrote the song and submitted it to the film's production team.  They were reluctant but then approved it; shooting and recording took place after the other parts of the film had been completed.

Popular culture
The song is used in the trailer for the upcoming Netflix miniseries The Watcher.

Charts

Weekly charts

Year-end charts

Sonia version

In 1994, English singer Sonia took over the role of Sandy in a West End production of Grease, replacing Debbie Gibson. In conjunction, she released a cover version of the song. The single was released in July 1994 as a non-album single. It has a double A-side released as a B-side "The Anthem Medley". On the 12-inch single, "The Anthem Medley" was released as the A-side and "Hopelessly Devoted to You" as the B-side. The music video for Sonia's version of "Hopelessly Devoted to You" features Sonia walking through an old city and singing. The music video for "The Anthem Medley" features Sonia dancing and singing in a nightclub. The single become her first not to reach top forty in the United Kingdom, where it peaked at number sixty-one.

Formats and track listings
 CD single
 "Hopelessly Devoted to You" – 2:58
 "The Anthem Medley" – 4:24
 "The Anthem Medley" (club mix) – 7:04
 "The Anthem Medley" (extended mix) – 6:24

 7-inch single
 "Hopelessly Devoted to You" – 2:58
 "The Anthem Medley" – 4:24

 12-inch single
 "The Anthem Medley" (club mix) – 7:04
 "The Anthem Medley" (extended mix) – 6:24
 "Hopelessly Devoted to You" – 2:58

Charts

References

External links
 

1978 songs
1978 singles
1994 singles
Olivia Newton-John songs
Songs from Grease (film)
Songs from Grease (musical)
RPM Top Singles number-one singles
Irish Singles Chart number-one singles
Songs written by John Farrar
Song recordings produced by John Farrar
Sonia (singer) songs
RSO Records singles
Bertelsmann Music Group singles